Suwu (Su), or Subu (also Isuwu, Isu, Isubu), is a Bantu language of Cameroon.

References

 

Sawabantu languages
Languages of Cameroon